Mausoleum of Huseyn Javid – is a mausoleum erected on a grave of Huseyn Javid, an eminent Azerbaijani poet and playwright, in Nakhchivan.

History
The complex was erected on the initiative Heydar Aliyev, the third president of Azerbaijan. Graves of Mishkinaz khanim – Huseyn Javid’s wife, Ertoghrul – Huseyn Javid’s son and Turan khanim – Huseyn Javid’s daughter are also in a vault of the mausoleum. The mausoleum was built on October 29, 1996 on the occasion of the 114th anniversary of Huseyn Javid’s birth.

Architectural features
The mausoleum built in Nakchivan-Maragha architectural style, consists of two parts – upper and lower. There is Huseyn Javid’s bust in the internal part of the mausoleum. Rasim Aliyev - Honored Architect of Azerbaijan is the author of the project and Omar Eldarov – People’s Artist of Azerbaijan is its sculptor.

References

Buildings and structures completed in 1996
Nakhchivan (city)
Mausoleums in Azerbaijan
Tourist attractions in Azerbaijan
1996 establishments in Azerbaijan
Tourist attractions in Nakhchivan